The 28th National Hockey League All-Star Game was held in the Montreal Forum in Montreal, home to the Montreal Canadiens, on January 21, 1975. The NHL expansion changed the format of the NHL All-Star game into a battle of conferences. The Wales Conference All-Star team easily won the initial contest, trouncing the Campbell Conference 7–1. Syl Apps Jr. was voted the game's most valuable player after scoring two goals. The game was also notable for the first female reporters allowed in a men's professional sports locker room, Robin Herman (The New York Times) and Marcelle St. Cyr (CKLM radio in Montreal).

Team lineups 
Syl Apps Jr. was the first son of an NHL All-Star to appear in an All-Star game. The era of exclusively Canadian NHL All-Star lineups finally ended as Curt Bennett (born in Canada but raised in Rhode Island and an American citizen) became only the third American hockey player to participate in an NHL All-Star game. From this point on, there has always be at least one non-Canadian NHL All-Star as the number of American and European NHL players have increased dramatically since the early 1970s.

Game summary 

Goaltenders : 
 Wales  : Vachon (30:39 minutes), Dryden (29:21 minutes).
 Campbell : Parent (29:17 minutes), Smith (30:43 minutes).

Shots on goal : 
Wales (37) 14 - 09 - 14 
Campbell (29) 10 - 09 - 10 

Referee : Wally Harris

Linesmen : Leon Stickle, Claude Béchard

See also
1974–75 NHL season

References
 

All
National Hockey League All-Star Games
National Hockey League All-Star Game
National Hockey League All-Star Game